Granpa is a British family-oriented animated film that adapts a picture book by John Burningham. Produced by TVS for Channel 4 Television in 1989, it was released on VHS by Universal Studios in 1994.

An expensive film to produce, Granpa is hand-illustrated with coloured pencil, imitating Burningham's style in the book. It was directed by Dianne Jackson, who had previously adapted The Snowman by Raymond Briggs (1978), a wordless picture book, as an exceptionally successful family-oriented animated film (1982). Howard Blake, who wrote the music for The Snowman, wrote the music and the script for Granpa, which is referred to as an "animated children's opera". The voices of Granpa and Emily are by Peter Ustinov and Emily Osborne.

Granpa won the Prix Jeunesse International award for excellence in children's television programming in 1990.

Book
The animated film is an adaptation of the children's picture book Granpa, written and illustrated by John Burningham and published by Jonathan Cape in 1984. Burningham won the Kurt Maschler Award, or "the Emil", from Maschler publishers and BookTrust, which annually recognised the author(s) of one "work of imagination for children, in which text and illustration are integrated so that each enhances and balances the other."

Plot
The film celebrates the relationship between a small girl named Emily (voiced by Emily Osborne), and her kindly but ailing grandfather (voiced by Peter Ustinov), along with a dog. Emily's playful innocence is contrasted with Granpa's increasing frailty. Aware that he will not be around for much longer, he shares his memories of adventures and days gone by.

These memories are vividly brought to life by her grandfather's tales, beginning with a description of Granpa's childhood and youth in the early part of the 20th Century. Other adventures include a chivalrous tale of Saint George and the Dragon imagined on a bedcover, a fishing trip which ends with a journey down the Thames pulled by a blue whale, a trip to the seaside which culminates in a re-enactment of the Battle of Britain and a Noah's Ark-influenced story, where Granpa's house is submerged and the pair have to accommodate exotic animals. The final jungle section, in which monkeys steal Granpa's storybook, is left intentionally incomplete.

As the seasons pass, Granpa grows frailer, and eventually Emily is left alone with an empty chair and the old man's loyal dog. She leaves the house with the dog and climbs a hill. As they travel, a group of children from her grandfather's stories join them.

Production
In 1984, following the success of the animated Christmas film The Snowman, Channel 4 commissioned another animation from TVC studios; producer John Coates approached Dianne Jackson and composer Howard Blake, suggesting Burningham's picture book Granpa. Blake was initially reluctant due to the book's upsetting ending, but was convinced after witnessing his own daughter's reaction to her grandfather's death that year.

John Coates said that, a month after agreeing to do the film, Blake and Jackson told him that the subject was too dark and they were not going to proceed with it, but several hours of persuasion from Coates brought them back on board.

Fiona Collins noted in Turning the Page: Children's Literature in Performance and the Media that while Burningham's book is open ended, with Emily ultimately left alone to contemplate her grandfather's death, the film offers a less "stark" interpretation; his death is explored through her implied remembrance of him in the final scene. Collins suggests that this was probably because the original offered an unremittingly bleak ending that would be difficult for its intended child audience.

The film was entirely financed by Channel 4 and cost over one million pounds to make according to Coates. It was first broadcast on the channel on New Year's Eve 1989 at 6.30pm.

Music
The musical score was written and composed by Howard Blake and is almost in the form of a miniature opera, with many of the tales within the animation sung by the lead characters, along with children from the Wroughton Middle School choir (winners of BBC Choir of the Year) and a forty-piece orchestra (the Sinfonia of London).

The end title song "Make Believe" is performed by Sarah Brightman and has the theme of "Auld Lang Syne" as a counter-melody. The song was released as a single at the time.

Reception
The film won the Prix Jeunesse International award for excellence in children's television programming in 1990. The film review site Rotten Tomatoes has called the film "a sensitive and life-affirming animated adaptation".

The "Toonhound" review suggest that the film takes the tone of the ending of The Snowman even further, "exploring an aspect of life rarely approached in animated form." Paul Madden, writing Dianne Jackson's obituary in 1993 suggests that the film "was less of immediate popular appeal than The Snowman, but was perhaps more satisfying to her creatively, demanding a more subtle approach." Toonhound notes that "Just like that film there is a tangible sense of loss at the end; a loss which builds with repeated viewings. You know that Granpa won't be playing with Emily for much longer, and what's more, you're aware that he knows this too."

Ownership
The film has rarely been repeated, and has never been released on DVD.  A special screening had to be arranged for Peter Ustinov to see his film, as he had been away in America on the day that it was broadcast.

After owners TVS lost their licence in December 1992, they sold their film library, which included Granpa. The title went through MTM Enterprises, Family Channel, Fox Kids and finally Disney. The film is believed to be confined to the Disney Vault.

See also

References

External links
 
 
 Granpa at the British Film Institute
 
 Granpa at Toonhound.com
 Granpa at Fandando.com
 Howard Blake official site 
 Samples of Granpa music scores by Howard Blake

1989 films
1989 short films
1989 animated films
British children's animated films
British graphic novels
Animated films based on children's books
Films scored by Howard Blake
1980s English-language films
1980s British films